is a Japanese master of Seidokaikan karate and founder of the K-1 fighting circuit, a widely televised international martial arts competition combining Muay Thai, karate, sanshou, taekwondo, kenpo, boxing, and kickboxing. His karate training began with Kyokushin karate, but he formed his own karate organization in 1980, began promoting televised karate competitions, and started staging K-1 events in 1993.

Early life
Ishii was born on June 10, 1953, in Uwajima, Ehime Prefecture, Japan. He is one of three siblings. As a boy, he was interested in sumo and baseball, and was also introduced to gymnastics. While Ishii was in junior high school, a book by Masatoshi Nakayama sparked his interest in Shotokan karate, but a Sonny Chiba film later inspired him to pursue training in Kyokushin karate.

Karate career
Ishii began training in Kyokushin karate under Hideyuki Ashihara, who was then a senior instructor in Kyokushin's International Karate Organization (IKO). By the time he was 16 years old, he had established a local Kyokushin dojo (training hall) under his instructor's supervision. Six years later, in 1975, he opened a Kyokushin dojo in Osaka, and this was a very successful venture.

When Ashihara left the IKO a few years later, Ishii followed, but then left Ashihara's organization after only a few months. He founded his own organization, Seidokaikan Karate, in 1980. Ishii's organization had dojo in the Kansai region. Within the next two years, he was promoting televised full-contact karate tournaments. In 1983, Ishii became the first Chairman of the newly formed All Japan Budo Promotion Association. Seidokaikan's reputation grew as Ishii's students, such as Masaaki Satake, Toshiyuki Yanagisawa, and Toshiyuki Atokawa, earned tournament victories.

K-1 promotional career
Following almost a decade of development, Ishii staged the inaugural K-1 tournament in Yoyogi Hall, Tokyo, in April 1993. According to The Japan Times, the "K" element came from kakutogi (a Japanese collective noun for combat techniques) and the "1" element came from the competition's single weight division and the champion's unique position (given the single weight division). According to Black Belt magazine, Ishii said that he chose the "K" element since it was the first letter in the names of karate, kickboxing, kung fu, kempo, and many other combative arts. K-1's official website states that the "K" element also stands for "King."

Over the next ten years, the K-1 competition expanded to 24 events each year, across Japan, Europe, and North America. In January 2003, Black Belt magazine named Ishii as its Man of the Year for 2002. Together with late K-1 fighter Andy Hug (1964–2000), Ishii supported the production of Street Fighter II: The Animated Movie (where he voiced the character of Fei-Long in the original Japanese audio) by creating fight scenes that utilized real-life combat techniques. In the PlayStation video game titled K-1 Revenge, he also appears as the fighting boss "Master Ishii", whose character can be unlocked in the video game when completing the single player mode for the first time.

See also
 Sadaharu Tanikawa
 Pierre Andurand
 Chatri Sityodtong
 Simon Rutz
 Eduard Irimia

References

External links
 Seidokaikan Karate
 K-1 Official Website
 Ishii's Message
 IKF K-1 NEWS SITE

1953 births
Living people
Japanese male karateka
Seidokaikan practitioners
Karate coaches
Martial arts school founders
K-1 executives
People from Uwajima, Ehime
Sportspeople from Ehime Prefecture
Kyokushin kaikan practitioners
Japanese people convicted of tax crimes